Mattias Kristoffer Therman (born 10 April 1974) is a Finnish businessman and rally driver. He was an owner of Hartwall beverage company and in 2008 he earned more capital gains (over 28 million €) than anyone else in Finland.

Rally career
Therman's rallying career began as a co-driver in 2007. In 2008 he began driving in his first events in his native Finland, and competed in Wales Rally GB at the end of the year, finishing 25th overall. In 2009 he established Team Therminator, and competed on Rally Finland, entered under the Munchi's Ford World Rally Team banner in a Ford Focus RS WRC 08, finishing 15th overall.

In December 2009 it was announced that Marcus Grönholm would return to the World Rally Championship on the 2010 Rally Sweden driving a Focus WRC for Team Therminator alongside Therman. Nearer the event the pair were brought under the Stobart Ford World Rally Team banner, with Gronholm registered to score manufacturer points for the squad. Gronholm and Therman finished 21st and 24th respectively. For Rally Finland Juha Kankkunen will join Therman racing under the Stobart banner.

WRC results

References

External links
Team Therminator
Profile at eWRC-results.com

Living people
1974 births
Finnish businesspeople
Finnish rally drivers
M-Sport drivers
World Rally Championship drivers